Markid (also Romanized as Markīd; also known as Marchit, Margīd, Margīeh, Margīt, Markīt, and Morkīt) is a village in Zolbin Rural District of Yamchi District, Marand County, East Azerbaijan province, Iran. At the 2006 National Census, its population was 2,735 in 701 households. The following census in 2011 counted 2,987 people in 888 households. The latest census in 2016 showed a population of 3,104 people in 954 households; it was the largest village in its rural district.

Etymology 
According to Vladimir Minorsky, the name "Margid" is derived from the historical Mongol tribe of Merkit.

References 

Marand County

Populated places in East Azerbaijan Province

Populated places in Marand County